Greenside, is a suburb of Johannesburg, South Africa. Greenside borders on the suburbs Emmarentia, Parkview, Parkhurst and Victory Park.

History
Greenside lies on land that once made up the Braamfontein Farm, one of many large farms that makes what is Johannesburg and its suburbs. The farm land was bought in 1886 by Lourens Geldenhuys for its mining rights as it was hoped that the Confidence Reef would extend into his farm but it did not. Land remained as a farm and by 1891 it was divided, along what is now Orange Road, between his son's Frans and Louw where the brothers had already built two farm houses. Louw Geldenhuys died in 1929 and his wife Emmarentia would begin to sell parts of the farm that became the surrounding suburbs, one of which became Greenside on 4 February 1931 and was surveyed by the Rand Mines Group.

Greenside's name is considered to be Scottish in origin, and refers to the adjacent Parkview Golf Club. The golf course has its origins much earlier than the suburb, established in 1916 and modified again in 1930. Most of the roads in Greenside were named after golf courses or professional golfers. Leitch Road was named after the Scottish golfer Charlotte Cecilia Pitcairn Leitch. Quimet Street is named after the America golfer Francis Ouimet - how the confusion arose between the O and the Q is not known - suffice to say that it causes never-ending confusion as to the pronunciation of the street name (should it be pronounced in the French or American style), and for people seeking to locate the street. By 1940, Greenside Primary School had been established and Greenside High School would follow in January 1961. Pirates Sports & Rugby Club was based in the suburb from 1952 on land donated to the City of Johannesburg by the Sir Lionel Phillips Trust based inside the Sir Lionel Phillips Park, though the club originated elsewhere in 1888.

Areas of interest
Greenside has recently become a restaurant centre with about a dozen high-end restaurants, giving it a similar atmosphere to Parkhurst, Norwood and Melville. Other places of interest are:

 Village Green Shopping Centre
 Pirates Sports & Rugby Club
 Sir Lionel Phillips Park
 Parkview Golf Club

Education
 Greenside High School
 Greenside Primary School
 Greenside Design Center College of Design

References

External links
Greenside Residents Association
Greenside High School website
Suburbs of Johannesburg on south-african-hotels.com
Scottish placenames in Johannesburg, South Africa
The Emmarentia Residents' Association
Emmarentia Greenside Security Association

Johannesburg Region B